Rhysida immarginata is a species of centipedes in the family Scolopendridae. The species has been found in Africa (Sudan and Democratic Republic of the Congo), in South America (Cuba, El Salvador and Guatemala) and in Sri Lanka.

References

Porat C.O. von (1876). Om några exotiska Myriopoder - Bihang till Kongliga Svenska Vetenskaps-Akademien Handligar, 4(7) 48 pp., see p. 24.

immarginata
Animals described in 1876